Vavchuga is a rural locality (a village) in Kholmogorsky District, Arkhangelsk Oblast, Russia. The population was 8 as of 2012.

Geography 
Vavchuga is located 18 km east of Kholmogory (the district's administrative centre) by road. Lubyanki is the nearest rural locality.

References 

Rural localities in Kholmogorsky District